is a Japanese anime series created by Fujiko A. Fujio (the pen name for Motoo Abiko) in 1989 which ran for 200 episodes and was translated into many languages - Chinese, Hebrew, Spanish, Portuguese and Arabic. Abiko also adapted the series into a manga.

Synopsis 
While playing in his world Henbee fell down through a tunnel in a waterfall and woke up in the human world inside a closet of a kid named Maruko. The tunnel is closed, preventing him from returning to his home world. Henbee possesses a magical parasol and with it he can fly and do magic, he also can speak to animals and fulfill everyone's dreams. Soon Henbee and Maruko become friends, and Henbee gets to help him out while staying at Maruko's house. Occasionally the tunnel back to his home world opens and animals and friends from his home world come through. Later when Henbee gets the chance to return to his home world, he hesitates due to his friendship with Maruko. Later in the series Henbee and Maruko travel to his home world with Henbee's magical Parasol.

Characters 
 Henbee (Voiced by: Meiko Nakamura) – The main character of the series. A mysterious small talking pink hippopotamus-like creature. He has a magical parasol and with it he can fly and do magic, he also can speak to animals and fulfill everyones dreams.
 Maruko (Voiced by: Junko Hori) –
 Megeru (Voiced by: Noriko Hidaka) –
 Abuko (Voiced by: Rei Sakuma) –
 Izumi (Voiced by: Rei Sakuma) –
 Memosuke (Voiced by: Ryusei Nakao) –
 Gorita (Voiced by: Tesshō Genda) –

External links 
 

1989 anime television series debuts
1990 video games
1991 manga
1991 video games
Adventure anime and manga
Comedy anime and manga
Epoch Co. games
Fantasy anime and manga
Fujiko Fujio A
NHK original programming
Game Boy games
Japan-exclusive video games
Nintendo Entertainment System games
Platform games
Shōnen manga
Video games based on anime and manga
Video games developed in Japan